Richard W. Worman (born July 3, 1933) is an American former politician from the state of Indiana. A Republican, he served in the Indiana House of Representatives and Indiana State Senate in a legislative career spanning 1972 to 1998. He is an insurance executive and Chartered Life Underwriter.

References

Living people
1933 births
Members of the Indiana House of Representatives
Indiana state senators